Eureka Seven, known in Japan as , is a 2005 Japanese anime series created by Bones. The series was directed by Tomoki Kyoda, with series composition by Dai Satō, character designs by Kenichi Yoshida and music by Naoki Satō. Eureka Seven tells the story of Renton Thurston and the outlaw group Gekkostate, his relationship with the enigmatic mecha pilot Eureka, and the mystery of the Coralians. The fifty-episode series aired in Japan on MBS between April 2005 and April 2006. It was licensed by Funimation in North America, Madman Entertainment in Australia and New Zealand and by Anime Limited in the United Kingdom for English home video releases.

The series spawned six manga adaptations, a light novel, three video games and a feature-length anime film which was released in Japan in April 2009. One of the manga titled Eureka Seven: AO which was serialized in Shōnen Ace between January 2012 and October 2013, was further adapted into an anime series which aired twenty-four episodes in Japan between April and November 2012. Eureka Seven was well received by critics and earned several awards at numerous award shows in Japan, most notably the 2006 Tokyo International Anime Fair.

Overview

Setting
 Scub Coral

In the current timeline, the remnants of humanity are now settled on an unknown planet (actually a terraformed Earth) known as the Land of Kanan, but the majority of the surface of this planet is now covered by a rock-like surface formed by the Scub Coral. The Scub Coral inhabited the Planet until the return of humans. The theory that the Scub Coral is an intelligent life form was proposed by the scientist Adroc Thurston, who also claimed the Scub is looking for mutual co-existence with humanity. All theories and information about the Scub Coral being a sentient being are kept from the general population. In addition to being the surface of the planet, the Scub Coral has several physical manifestations, called , that are observed throughout the series. These manifestations are either natural occurrences or a response to attacks from humans. The manifestations are:
 Command Cluster Coralian
 The Command Cluster is a large concentration of the Scub Coral which acts as the central mind for the rest of its "body". It stores all the information the Scub has collected over the last 10,000 years, and keeps the rest of the Scub Coral in a dormant state.
 Kute-class Coralian
 A Kute-class is massive sphere of concentrated energy that materializes suddenly in the skies. Though it is a rare natural occurrence, they can be artificially triggered by causing heavy damage to the Scub Coral. The disappearance of a Kute causes a massive release of energy, ravaging the surrounding landscape and lowering the Trapar count in the area to almost non-existent levels.
 Antibody Coralians
 Antibody Coralians are, as the name suggests, creatures created by the Scub Coral to destroy anything nearby that might be causing it harm. They are unleashed in massive swarms through a Kute-class Coralian when the Scub Coral is threatened or attacked. These antibodies can range in size from as small as a wheelbarrow, or as large as a bomber plane. Their shapes vary wildly, from eyeballs to flying slugs to giant hovering flower-like objects. Most forms are based on the sea creatures they absorbed when they just started their 'growth'. Their powers are: sending lasers in profusion from their bodies, thus being able to destroy large aircraft, burrowing into a victim's body and imploding it (unconfirmed), and creating a spherical void, which makes anything within its surface area to vanish. Antibody Coralians generally appear in response to deliberate attacks on the Scub Coral. They appear for 1246 seconds (20 minutes 46 seconds) - which is the amount of time the Seven Swell phenomenon is active. After those 1246 seconds, they crumble to dust. Their appearances are that of basic invertebrates such as flat worms, mollusks, and cnidaria. One of each kind appears in Another Century's Episode 3: The Final and Super Robot Wars Z.
 Human-form Coralians
 Human-form Coralians are beings created by the Scub Coral in the form of humans. They are regarded by scientists as emissaries of the Scub Coral, sent to learn about humanity. Humans have attempted to create their own artificial human-form Coralians, but the results are often less than satisfactory. As shown with Eureka in the sequel series, human-form Coralians are biologically capable of reproducing the same way as humans do; she gave birth to a daughter and son. However, due to her children being Human-Coralian hybrids, the high level of Trapar would be too dangerous for them.
 Trapar waves and lifting
Norbu, the Vodarac leader, states that all thought carries with it energy. As a result, a sentient life form on the scale of the Scub Coral produces a tremendous amount of energy. The most important use of Trapar energy is its use as a method of propulsion for flight-capable vehicles.
Lifting uses surfboard-like devices called "reflection boards" ( for short) to ride Trapar waves in a manner similar to surfing, and is a popular sport in the series. The most grandiose use of Trapar—massive humanoid fightercraft—are a recent development, made possible by the discovery of bizarre alien life-forms within the Scub Coral.

Plot

The series focuses on Renton Thurston, the fourteen-year-old son of Adrock Thurston, a military researcher who died saving the world. He lives what he considers a boring life with his grandfather in a boring town. He loves lifting, a sport similar to surfing but with trapar, a substance abundant throughout the air, as the medium. He dreams of joining the renegade group Gekkostate, led by his idol Holland Novak, a legendary lifter. 
    
An opportunity to do so literally falls into his lap when a large mechanical robot, called the Nirvash type ZERO, and Eureka, its pilot and a member of Gekkostate, crash into Renton's room. Renton's grandfather orders him to deliver a special part to the Nirvash called the "Amita Drive", which releases the immense power dormant within the type ZERO called the "Seven Swell Phenomenon". Afterwards, Renton is invited to join Gekkostate, where he quickly discovers that the behind-the-scenes life of Gekkostate is hardly as glamorous or as interesting as printed in the glossy pages of their magazine, ray=out. Only one thing makes it all worthwhile for him: the presence of Eureka, the mysterious pilot of the Nirvash. Renton, Eureka, and the Gekkostate embark on an adventure that will shape their future as well as the world's.

Development

The series was made by Bones and co-produced by Bandai Entertainment. Bandai Entertainment provided the title and handled the creative aspects of the series. Bandai had originally proposed a mecha anime series to the animation studio Bones. The studio had initially rejected it, but later reversed its position because it had already planned to create an anime using mecha designs by Shoji Kawamori. With the appointment of director Tomoki Kyoda and writer Dai Satō, Bandai's proposal was more or less scrapped and the staff began work on their own series that would become Eureka Seven.

While conceptualizing Eureka Seven, Kyoda "wanted something that reflected the music and the subculture of his generation—and a love story." As such the show contains several references from music of the 1980s and the 1990s, and almost all of the show's episodes are named after real songs, composed by both Japanese and foreign artists.

The director wished to design the series as one that would at first focus on the personal elements and conflicts of the characters, then subsequently move the framework into a broader scale and perspective. The series' two halves each have their own very clear focus that reflects this design choice.

With the premise of the surfer robots in mind, Satō interviewed several real-life surfers and came to conclusion that they are close to nature. From this perception, he envisioned the environmental thematic as central point of the story. He said "I thought it might be an effective message for children, especially in Japan. It's pretty veiled. I didn't want to be preachy."

Release

Anime

Eureka Seven consists of fifty episodes which aired from April 17, 2005, to April 2, 2006, on the Mainichi Broadcasting System and Tokyo Broadcasting System networks.

Eureka Seven was available for online viewing on the Adult Swim Fix, Adult Swim's online video service before its televised debut on the Adult Swim channel between April 16, 2006, and ended on April 29, 2007. Adult Swim traditionally cut down the opening and ending themes from each episode to fit the series to American television's time restraints, which resulted in the final episode's first airing having actual content cut from it as the episode originally had no theme song sequences; it was re-aired properly the following week. In Canada, Eureka Seven premiered on YTV's Bionix block on September 8, 2006.

Bandai Entertainment and its affiliates distributed the English version of Eureka Seven. It was released in the United States and Canada by Bandai Visual USA, in the United Kingdom by Beez Entertainment, and in Australia by Madman Entertainment. The first translated Region 1 DVD volume of the series was released on April 25, 2006, in the U.S., while the European Region 2 version was released on September 25, 2006. The English version was produced by Bang Zoom! Entertainment in Burbank, California. Following the 2012 closure of Bandai Entertainment, Funimation acquired the rights to the TV series and re-released the series on Blu-ray and DVD in 2014.

An anime sequel titled Eureka Seven: AO began airing on April 12, 2012, and ended on November 20, 2012. There is a total of 24 episodes. It has been released in Japan on Blu-ray and DVD, along with an OVA titled "The Flower Fields of Jungfrau". On May 16, 2013, Funimation announced the official release date in English dub. The first twelve dubbed episodes were released on DVD/Blu-ray on August 13, 2013, and the rest of the series released on October 15, 2013. On January 6, 2014, Manga Entertainment had released the first half of the series.

Music

Eureka Seven uses ten pieces of theme music. The opening themes of Eureka Seven are "Days" by Flow (episodes 1–13),  by Home Made Kazoku (episodes 14–26), by Bivattchee (episodes 27–32, 34–39) and "Sakura" by Nirgilis (episodes 40–49).

The soundtrack music is available on three different albums composed by Naoki Satō and a variety of other artists who composed insert songs used in the series. The first and second soundtrack albums were released on November 2, 2005 and April 5, 2006, respectively. The third soundtrack, titled Eureka Seven: Complete Best include the full-length versions of the opening and ending themes for both the series and game, as well as the insert song for the final episode.

The anime adaptation of Eureka Seven: AO uses six pieces of theme music. For the 13 first episodes, the opening theme is "Escape" performed by Hemenway and the ending theme is "stand by me" by Stereopony. Starting with episode 14, the opening theme changes to  performed by FLOW and the ending theme changes to  performed by joy. The two insert songs are "Parallel Sign" and "Seven Swell", both performed by LAMA.

Media

Manga

A manga adaptation of the original anime was created by Jinsei Kataoka and Kazuma Kondou. The manga was published by Kadokawa Shoten and began serialization in Monthly Shōnen Ace from the March 2005 issue and ended in the January 2007 issue, with a total of 23 chapters. The chapters were later compiled into six volumes. Viz Media published the manga digitally. A second manga titled  by Miki Kizuki, features the protagonists of the video games New Wave and New Vision. It was published by Kadokawa Shoten and serialized in Comptiq magazine. Two volumes were released in Japan on November 7, 2005, and September 26, 2006, respectively. Viz Media also published this series digitally. A manga adapting a proposed alternative ending of the series, titled Psalms of Planets Eureka Seven New Order was serialized in Comptiq by Kadokawa Shoten between June 2012 and May 2013 and compiled into two volumes.

On December 22, 2011, Kadokawa Shoten's Monthly Shōnen Ace magazine announced that a sequel manga titled Eureka Seven: AO based on the sequel series would be launched in their January 2012 issue. It featured an original story by Bones and was illustrated by Yūichi Katō. The manga began in January 2012, and concluded in October 2013, with a total of 21 chapters spanning over five volumes. A spin-off manga titled Eureka Seven AO - Save a Prayer began in February in Kadokawa Shoten's Newtype A and concluded in June 2013, and focuses on a girl named Yuna and her two friends as they make their way from becoming trainees in Generation Bleu's Headquarters. It was compiled into two volumes.  A manga titled Eureka Seven nAnO was published as a 4koma in Kadokawa Shoten's 4-koma Nano A from July 2012 to January 2013, and featured characters from the AO series. It was compiled into one volume.

Light novel

A light novel series written by Tomonori Sugihara and illustrated by Robin Kishiwada was published by Kadokawa Shoten under their male oriented Sneaker Bunko label in 2005 and 2006. Bandai Entertainment released all four volumed in English between 2009 and 2011. A novelization of the film Pocketful of Rainbows sharing the same name was also written by Tomonori Sugihara and illustrated by Hiroki Kazui and Seiji was released in Japan on May 1, 2009.

Video games

Eureka Seven has four video games, developed by Bandai and later Namco Bandai Games. The game features a different cast of characters and takes place two years before the anime. A sequel, was released in Japan on May 11, 2006, and in North America on April 17, 2007. New Vision takes place two years after the events of New Wave. Both games were released on the PlayStation 2 and feature the theme song "Realize", sung by Flow. A PlayStation Portable game sharing the same name of the anime was released on April 6, 2006, in Japan. This game is based on the events from the first half of the show. An action game based on the AO sequel series, Eureka Seven: AO Attack the Legend, was released on the PlayStation 3 on September 20, 2012.

Films
A theatrical adaptation, was first announced in the May 2008 issue of Newtype; it was publicly released on April 25, 2009, during Golden Week, with the animation production handled by Kinema Citrus. It contained a new mythos in an alternative universe, despite still featuring Renton and Eureka as the main characters, and confirming the events of the original series happened in a parallel world. The main theme song for the film is "Space Rock", by iLL.

Good Night, Sleep Tight, Young Lovers screened at select theaters nationwide in the U.S. for a one night–only special event on September 24, 2009, courtesy of Fathom Events. The movie also played at the Fantasia festival in Montreal on July 28, 2009.

A second three-part theatrical adaptation, was announced on March 17, 2017. The film trilogy takes place before and during the events of the original series, as well as having an original story. The first movie, was released on September 16, 2017. It shows the "First Summer of Love" phenomenon, previously only alluded to in the series and retells the "Charles and Ray" arc (mainly episodes 22–27) of the original. The second film, taking place in an alternative universe and focusing on Anemone, was released on November 10, 2018, under the title . The last film, titled  was originally planned for release in 2019, but was delayed to early summer 2021.  It was delayed again to November 26, 2021.

At Anime Boston, Masahiko Minami confirmed that the first film of the trilogy will premiere in Japan, the United States, the United Kingdom, France, Australia, Singapore, Malaysia, Indonesia, and Thailand in Fall 2017, and that Funimation will distribute the film in the United States. Madman Entertainment distributed the film in Australia and New Zealand. Anime Limited distributed the film in the UK. Odex distributed the film in Southeast Asian territories.

Reception

Towards the end of its original Japanese run, Eureka Seven won multiple awards at the 2006 Tokyo International Anime Fair, including Best Television Series, Best Screenplay for Dai Satō, and Best Character Designs for Kenichi Yoshida. Yoshida, the series' main animator and character designer, also received an individual award at the 10th Animation Kobe Awards in September 2005. The series also won an award at the 20th Digital Content Grand Prix in Japan in January 2006. At the Anime Expo 2006 SPJA Awards, Eureka Seven won the award for Best Television Series, and Best Female Character for Eureka. Anime Insider voted it "Best DVD Series of the Year" in 2006. During a conference in 2010, writer Dai Satō claimed that many anime fans dismissed Eureka Seven as a clone of Neon Genesis Evangelion without even watching it.

The sequel series, Eureka Seven: AO, was met with mixed-to-negative reviews from fans and critics, who criticized the series for contradicting themes of Eureka Seven; primarily the fact Renton and Eureka's children cant survive in the 22nd century due hybrids reacting badly to Trapar. It was however awarded the jury selection prize by the 17th Japan Media Arts Festival Awards.

Notes

References

External links

  
 Series outline on MBS 
 

Eureka Seven
Fiction set in the 7th millennium or beyond
2005 Japanese novels
2005 manga
2005 anime television series debuts
2009 anime films
2012 anime television series debuts
2017 anime films
Anime series
Adventure anime and manga
Anime with original screenplays
Animeism
Aniplex
Bandai Entertainment anime titles
Bandai Entertainment manga titles
Bandai Namco franchises
Bandai Visual
Bones (studio)
Coming-of-age anime and manga 
Environmental television
Fictional motorsports in anime and manga
Funimation
Kadokawa Shoten manga
Kadokawa Sneaker Bunko
Kinema Citrus
Light novels
Mainichi Broadcasting System original programming
Mecha anime and manga
Romance anime and manga
Films with screenplays by Shō Aikawa
Shōnen manga
TBS Television (Japan) original programming
Toonami
Films scored by Naoki Satō
Viz Media manga